Gypsy (GyDB) is a wiki-style database of mobile genetic elements.

See also
 Classification of mobile genetic elements
 Horizontal gene transfer

References

External links
 http://gydb.org.

Biological databases
Mobile genetic elements
MediaWiki websites
Wiki communities